Grady Leslie Patterson, Jr. (January 13, 1924 – December 7, 2009) was a Democratic Party politician who served as the South Carolina Treasurer and a United States Air Force Lieutenant General.

Born in Calhoun Falls, South Carolina, Patterson graduated from University of South Carolina. He served in World War II in the U.S. Army Air Forces, flying missions from Iwo Jima as a fighter pilot. In 1946, he became a member of the South Carolina Air National Guard serving in the Korean War and the Berlin Airlift. He also served as Chief of Staff for the South Carolina Air National Guard and Assistant to the Commander of the United States Air Force Logistics Command. When he retired in 1984, the South Carolina State Legislature promoted him from Major General to Lieutenant General.

Patterson served as Assistant Attorney General under Dan McLeod in 1959 until he was first elected in 1966 as the State Treasurer after the death of Jefferson Bates. He was re-elected in 1970, 1974, 1978, 1982, 1986 and 1990, serving a total of 36 years. He was defeated by Republican Richard Eckstrom in the Republican Revolution of 1994 but defeated Eckstrom in a rematch in 1998. He was re-elected in 2002 but in 2006, he was defeated by Republican Thomas Ravenel.

Notes

External links 

 Grady L. Patterson Papers at South Carolina Political Collections, University of South Carolina

People from Calhoun Falls, South Carolina
University of South Carolina alumni
State treasurers of South Carolina
United States Air Force generals
1924 births
2009 deaths
20th-century American politicians